KASC may refer to:

 KASC-LP, a defunct low-power television station (channel 7) formerly licensed to serve Atascadero, California, United States
 KASC (AM), a radio station (1330 AM) at Arizona State University
 King Abdullah Sports City

See also 
 Kask (disambiguation)
 CASC (disambiguation)
 Cask (disambiguation)
 Casque (disambiguation)